Kuldeep Singh Gangwar is a former Member of the Uttar Pradesh Legislative Assembly from Kaimganj (2007-2012).

References

Members of the Uttar Pradesh Legislative Assembly
Year of birth missing (living people)
Living people
Bahujan Samaj Party politicians from Uttar Pradesh